EIV may refer to 

Entertainment in Video
Errors-in-variables models
Ellenberg's indicator values
Fokker E.IV

See also
E4 (disambiguation)